Chained for Life is a 2019 American drama film written and directed by Aaron Schimberg. The title may refer to the 1952 film of the same title that featured conjoined twins Daisy and Violet Hilton, who had worked as singers and 'display' people in circuses and old style freak shows.

Plot
A beautiful actress struggles to connect with her disfigured co-star on the set of a European auteur's English-language debut.

Cast
 Jess Weixler as Mabel
 Adam Pearson as Rosenthal
 Stephen Plunkett as Max
 Charlie Korsmo as Herr Director
 Sari Lennick as Sarah

Reception
Its consensus reads, "Darkly funny and impressively ambitious, Chained for Life is as unpredictable as it is original." On Metacritic, the film has a weighted average score of 79 out of 100, based on 14 critics, indicating "generally favorable reviews".

References

External links
 
 
 

2019 films
2019 drama films
American drama films
Films about filmmaking
Films about actors
Films about disability
2010s English-language films
2010s American films